Hermann Pokorny (Kroměříž, Austro-Hungarian Empire, 1882–1960, Budapest, Hungary) was a World War I Austro-Hungarian Army cryptologist whose work with Russian ciphers contributed substantially to Central Powers victories over Russia. He was a member of the Hungarian Order of Vitéz.

Life 
Pokorny was born in Moravia into a German-speaking family. His father was the postmaster of Kroměříž. A cousin was Major Franciszek Pokorny, a Polish Army officer who after World War I headed the Polish General Staff's Cipher Bureau. In 1900 Herman Pokorny joined the k.u.k. Austro-Hungarian Army.  By 1918, when the Austro-Hungarian Empire fell, he was a lieutenant colonel.

During World War I, Pokorny, as a cryptologist in the rank of major, headed the Austro-Hungarian General Staff's Russian-Cipher Bureau. He showed great ability in decrypting Russian enciphered military messages that were broadcast by radio in 1914–17. He recognized that the Russian cryptographers had reduced the 35-letter Russian alphabet to 24 letters, while doubling the 11 missing letters to some of the other 24 letters. His break into the Russian military cipher system enabled  Austro-Hungarian and German forces to act in advance of impending Russian maneuvers, thus contributing substantially to Central Powers victories over the Russians. He is mentioned in Soviet Marshal Boris Shaposhnikov's famous book, Мозг армии (The Brain of the Army, 1929). For his services to cryptology, Pokorny was decorated with the Large Military Merit Medal with Swords in 1918. Founded on April 1, 1916, this honour was intended for the "highest especially praiseworthy recognition" and was awarded only 30 times. 28 of its recipients were officers of general's rank; the other two were the naval aviator Gottfried von Banfield (1916) and Pokorny himself.

After World War I, as a German-language native speaker, Pokorny did not request Czechoslovak or Austrian citizenship because he was not welcome in Czechoslovakia on account of his German roots nor in Austria because he had been born on Czech soil. Accordingly, in 1918 he joined the Hungarian Army and made his new life as a Hungarian citizen. He was promoted to colonel in 1925 and retired in 1935 in the rank of major general.

During World War II, he was not called up for military service.  After the Soviet Red Army captured Budapest in 1945, he volunteered to support Hungary's reconstruction. He worked for the Foreign Ministry (1945–49).  He went into his final retirement as a general, and died in Budapest in 1960.

Ranks 
	 August 1900: Cadet 
	 October 1901: 2nd Lieutenant 
	 October 1906: 1st Lieutenant  
	 April 1910: Captain 
	 May 1915: Major 
	 May 1917: Lieutenant Colonel  
	 December 1921: Colonel 
	 May 1925: Lieutenant General   
	 December 1928: Major General 
	 October 1945: General

See also
Franciszek Pokorny
Order of Vitéz

References 
 http://mek.niif.hu/02000/02095/html/index.htm MEK – Pokorny Herman: Emlékeim

Austro-Hungarian people of World War I
Pre-computer cryptographers
Austrian cryptographers
Austrian people of Moravian-German descent
Hungarian people of Czech descent
People from Kroměříž
1882 births
1960 deaths